The Gazelle Stakes (formerly Gazelle Handicap until 2004) is an American thoroughbred horse race held annually at Aqueduct Racetrack in Ozone Park, New York. It is a Grade III event run over a distance of  miles on dirt that is open to three-year-old fillies. The race was previously run in the Fall at Belmont Park and often used as a stepping stone to the Breeders' Cup Distaff. As of 2013, the race is now run in the Spring at Aqueduct, typically on the same day as the Wood Memorial, and is now used as a prep race for the Kentucky Oaks.

Race transition 
Race name
Gazelle Handicap: 1887–2004
Gazelle Stakes: since 2005
Grading
Grade I: 1984–2012
Grade II: 1973–1983 and since 2013
Distance
1987–1900: unknown
1900–1958: 1 1⁄16 miles
1959 and 1960: 1 mile
since 1961: 1 1⁄8 miles
Qualification
Three-year-old fillies
Only 1917–1920 Three-years-old and up fillies
Venue
Gravesend Race Track: 1887–1916
Belmont Park: 1956–1959, 1961, 1969–2008
Aqueduct Racetrack: 1917–1955, 1960, 1962–1968, since 2009
There were no races in 1911–1916, and 1933–1935.

Records

Time record: (at current distance of  miles)
 1:46.80 – Maud Muller (1974)

Most wins by a jockey:
 4 – Ángel Cordero Jr. (1974, 1976, 1985, 1991)
 4 – Javier Castellano (2001, 2006, 2008, 2014)

Most wins by an trainer:

 6 – James G. Rowe Sr. (1890, 1903, 1907, 1909, 1917, 1923)
 6 – C. R. McGaughey III (1986, 1991, 1993, 1994, 1996, 2006)
 6 – James E. Fitzsimmons (1924, 1927, 1929, 1930, 1942, 1960) 

Most wins by an owner:
 4 – Greentree Stable (1923, 1941, 1967, 1987)
 4 – Sarah & Walter Jeffords (1928, 1937, 1945, 1951)

Winners

References

Graded stakes races in the United States
Flat horse races for three-year-old fillies
1887 establishments in New York (state)
Gravesend Race Track
Belmont Park
Recurring sporting events established in 1887
Horse races in New York (state)
Grade 2 stakes races in the United States